The Società Sportiva Metanopoli (previously Società Sportiva Snam also known as Snam Gas Metano) is an Italian athletics club based in San Donato Milanese formed in 1953.

Achievements
Snam Gas Metano won 8 editions of the women's Italian Championships in Athletics for clubs (Campionati italiani di società di atletica leggera), and one edition of the European Champion Clubs Cup.
8 wins at the Italian Championships (1990, 1993, 1994, 1996, 1997, 1998, 1999, 2000)
1 win at the European Champion Clubs Cup (1996)

Main athletes
Fiona May
Antonella Bevilacqua
Antonella Bizioli
Barbara Lah
Agnese Maffeis (38 individual wins at the national championship)
Gennaro Di Napoli
Loris Paoluzzi
Stefano Tilli
Carla Tuzzi

See also
Athletics in Italy
Snam

References

External links
 Official site

Athletics clubs in Italy
1953 establishments in Italy